Brent Maher is a producer, engineer, and songwriter currently residing in Nashville, Tennessee.  He has produced and engineered six Grammy-winning records and received awards from the CMA, ACM, CCMA, ASCAP, SOCAN and NSAI. Maher engineered classic recordings like Ike and Tina Turner’s “Proud Mary” and The 5th Dimension's "Age of Aquarius". He discovered  The Judds and produced all ten of their albums, writing many of their hit songs. Maher has also served two terms on the board of directors of the Academy of Country Music.

Early life 
Born in Chase, Kansas, Maher lived there until he moved to Denver, Colorado as a teenager. He joined the Air Force after high school and was stationed near Nashville where he worked as an aircraft mechanic. During this time, he formed a cover band called "The Journeymen" and played guitar and trumpet. While reading the back of the album by Curtis Mayfield, he read in the credits "recording engineer" and realized that this was his calling. He took correspondence courses in sound and engineering. After leaving the Air Force at age 22, Maher was hired as a backup engineer in Nashville by Monument Records president, Fred Foster and chief engineer and eventual mentor, Bill Porter. Maher said, "As fate would have it, I walked through that door with my Sunday best suit on at the right time and they gave me an opportunity that changed my life". After a few years, Bill Porter purchased United Recording Studios in Las Vegas and asked Maher to go with him. Maher engineered classic recordings like Ike and Tina Turner’s “Proud Mary” and The 5th Dimension's "Age of Aquarius";  also recordings by Duke Ellington, Chuck Berry, Sammy Davis Jr., Gladys Knight, Sly and the Family Stone, and others.  Maher's work as a producer picked up when he recorded Benny Hester's debut LP in Vegas.

In the late 1970s, Maher moved back to Nashville to help owner Buzz Cason build Creative Workshop Recording Studio. In Nashville, Maher engineered Elvis' last number one song “Way Down" in addition to engineering records with Olivia Newton-John, Ray Charles, and Merle Haggard. Other producer credits include albums with Dottie West, Kenny Rogers and Dave Loggins. In the early '80's, Maher discovered mother/daughter duo, The Judds and developed their acoustic county sound. After getting The Judd's a record deal with RCA/Curb, he co-wrote many of their hits and produced all their platinum LP's.

Musical career

Songwriter 

Maher received Song of the Year by the Academy of Country Music for writing and producing the Judds’ 1984 chart-topping single, “Why Not Me.” It was followed by awards for “Girls Night Out” (1985), “Rockin' with the Rhythm of the Rain” (1986), “I Know Where I’m Going” (1987), "Let Me Tell You About Love" (1989), “Born To Be Blue” (1990), and other Judd hits. Maher also co-wrote many of Johnny Reid's hit singles in Canada including "Out of the Blue” (2007), "A Woman Like You” (2009 – CCMA for Single of Year), "Let's Go Higher" (2010), and "Today I'm Gonna Try and Change the World" (2010).

Additional hits include "Some Kind of Trouble" (Tanya Tucker), "A Lesson in Leavin'" (Dottie West, later covered by Jo Dee Messina), "When Love Starts Talkin'" (Wynonna), and other recordings by Tina Turner, Kenny Rogers, Dottie West, Carl Perkins, Jo Dee Messina, Wynonna, and Shelby Lynne.

Producer 

Maher produced all ten of The Judds’ records, Kathy Mattea’s “Good News,” Shelby Lynne's big band project “Temptation,” and albums by artists including Kenny Rogers, Dottie West, Benny Hester, and Jo Dee Messina.  On the international scene, Maher produced Canadian Country artist Johnny Reid's breakthrough Country record "Kicking Stones" and following LP's "Dance With Me" and "A Place Called Love," making Reid one of the top-selling artists in Canada. The albums won CCMA awards for Album of the Year (2009), Best Selling Canadian Album (2009, 2010, 2011), and a Juno Award for Country Album of the Year (2010, 2011). Maher also developed and produced the Grammy nominated self-titled debut from Bering Strait, a young band composed of seven Russian musicians whose story was covered by 60 Minutes.

Engineer 

Maher's engineering credits include all the projects he has produced, and also extend to Ike and Tina Turner's “Proud Mary,” Roy Orbison, Diana Ross & the Supremes, Faces, Duke Ellington, Chuck Berry, Sammy Davis Jr., Gladys Knight, Merle Haggard and the Strangers, Glen Campbell/ Tanya Tucker, Sly and the Family Stone, and others.

Publisher 

Brent Maher is also a music publisher and CEO of Moraine Music Group, which has produced hit singles over the last 20 years. His current studio is called The Blue Room and located in Nashville, Tennessee.

Awards and nominations

Grammy Awards 

2007 – Lost Highway – Willie Nelson and Ray Price (Engineer)

1993 – Good News – Kathy Mattea (Producer)

1991 –Love Can Build A Bridge – The Judds (Producer)

1988 – Give A Little Love – The Judds (Producer)

1986 – Grandpa – The Judds (Producer)

1984 – Mama, He's Crazy – The Judds (Producer)

ASCAP Awards 

1978 – Bluer Than Blue – Michael Johnson (Producer)

1979 – You Pick Me Up (And Put Me Down) – Dottie West (Writer)

1980 – Leavin's for Unbelievers – Dottie West (Writer)

1980 – A Lesson in Leavin' – Dottie West (Writer)

1985 – Why Not Me – The Judds (Writer)

1985 – Girls' Night Out – The Judds (Writer)

1986 – Rockin' with the Rhythm of the Rain – The Judds (Writer)

1988 – I Know Where I'm Going – The Judds (Writer)

1989 – Turn It Loose – The Judds (Writer)

1989 – Crying Shame – The Judds (Writer)

1990 – Let Me Tell You About Love – The Judds (Writer)

1991 – Born to be Blue – The Judds (Writer)

1992 – Some Kind of Trouble – Tanya Tucker (Writer)

NSAI Awards 

1987 – Rockin' with the Rhythm of the Rain – The Judds (Writer)

Songwriter discography

Other ventures 
Beyond his musical career, Brent Maher has given lectures on engineering and production for various schools and universities. Maher has one of the largest collections of vintage Gretsch guitars in the US. Maher was also one of the founding members of Middle Tennessee Fly Fishers Inc. In 2011, he created "Cowboy Golf" and now designs golf courses on farms, which led to founding the Boots and Bandana Golf Association based in Franklin, Tennessee at Pines Golf Course. Maher, John Reger, Jr. and Michael Pasternak and associates are currently establishing a network of BBGA courses with ranch owners and recreational facilities across the country to build their own cowboy style golf courses. The events benefit MusiCares, The Facial Pain Research Foundation, and Gentle Carousel Therapy Horses.

References 

 The Producer’s Chair: Brent Maher Posted on April 17, 2014, by Dan Harr Music News Nashville

External links 
 Brent Maher Official Website
  Moraine Music Group
 The Facial Pain Research Foundation
 Gentle Carousel: Little Therapy Horses with Big Hearts

Living people
American country record producers
People from Nashville, Tennessee
American country songwriters
American male songwriters
Songwriters from Tennessee
Year of birth missing (living people)
Canadian Country Music Association Songwriter(s) of the Year winners